Close Enough for Love is a 1989 studio album by Shirley Horn. It was her second album; her first studio album, was on the Verve Records label.

Reception

In his review for Allmusic, Scott Yanow wrote: "Performing with her usual trio...and guest tenor Buck Hill on five of the 13 tracks, Horn is heard in definitive form throughout these studio sessions."

Track listing
 "A Beautiful Friendship" (Donald Kahn, Stanley Styne) – 3:42
 "I Got Lost in His Arms" (Irving Berlin) – 4:15
 "Baby, Baby All the Time" (Bobby Troup) – 2:40
 "Close Enough for Love" (Johnny Mandel, Paul Williams) – 4:44
 "This Can't Be Love" (Lorenz Hart, Richard Rodgers) – 2:45
 "I Wanna Be Loved" (Johnny Green, Edward Heyman, Billy Rose) – 4:29
 "Come Fly with Me" (Sammy Cahn, Jimmy Van Heusen) – 4:00
 "Once I Loved (O Amor en Paz)" (Vinícius de Moraes, Ray Gilbert, Antonio Carlos Jobim) – 6:50
 "But Beautiful" (Johnny Burke, Van Heusen) – 4:32
 "Get Out of Town" (Cole Porter) – 2:42
 "Memories of You" (Eubie Blake, Andy Razaf) – 7:23
 "It Could Happen to You" (Burke, Van Heusen) – 2:48
 "So I Love You" (Carroll Coates) – 3:15

Personnel
Performance
Shirley Horn – piano, vocals
Buck Hill - tenor saxophone (tracks 1, 6-7, 11-12)
Charles Ables – bass guitar
Steve Williams – drums, percussion
Production
Seth Rothstein – production manager
Mitchell Kanner – art direction
Blaise Sires – assistant engineer
Dave Baker – engineer
Ron Berinstein – executive producer
Joel E. Siegel – liner notes
Joe Brescio – mastering
David Conrad – photography
Jeffrey Krein
Richard Seidel – producer
Pierre M. Sprey – technical assistance

References

1989 albums
Shirley Horn albums